Verwüstung – Invoke the Dark Age is the first studio album release by Black metal band Abigor. It was released in 1994.

Track listing
 "Universe of Black Divine" - 6:58
 "Kingdom of Darkness" - 8:15
 "Beneath a Steel Sky" - 1:54
 "Eye to Eye at Armageddon" - 5:26
 "In Sin" - 4:22
 "My Soft Vision in Blood" - 5:50
 "Weeping Midwintertears" - 4:47
 "Diabolic Unity" - 3:02
 "A Spell of Dark and Evil" - 2:03

Personnel
 Peter Kubik - guitars, bass  
 Thomas Tannenberger - drums, guitars
 Silenius - vocals

1994 albums
Abigor albums
Napalm Records albums